Pulak Rud Pey (also Romanized as Pūlak Rūd Pey) is a village in Sajjadrud Rural District, Bandpey-ye Sharqi District, Babol County, Mazandaran Province, Iran. At the 2006 census, its population was 218, in 53 families.

References 

Populated places in Babol County